COMET – Competence Centers for Excellent Technologies is a central funding program of the Austrian technology politics. It serves to create competence centers for various topics at selected locations.

Basic Strategy
The COMET program stimulates academic scientists and industrial researchers and developers to work together on strategic and translational research projects, closer to industry than university groups would typically work on, however concentrating on prototype research and not on products ready for the market.

History
Predecessors of the COMET program were the K_plus and K_ind programs of the Austrian government that started in 1998.

In 2006 the program was restructured and put in the hands of the Austrian Research Promotion Agency FFG under the new name COMET. At that time there were 18 competence centers active, with 270 scientific partners and 150 industry partners.

In 2012 there were more than 40 competence centers in operation, five of them in the largest class K2, 16 in the medium class K1, and - after the 4th call - 36 funded K-projects. A total of 1500 researchers were working in these projects in 2013.

Financing
The centers receive about 50% of their budget from the funding, and the other 50% have to be acquired from companies. 5% are expected as in-kind contributions from the scientific partners.

Current competence centers
The difference between K2, K1 and K is in size, budget, funding duration and international cooperation.

K2 Centers
K2 centers receive a funding for 10 years.

 ACCM – Austrian Center of Competence of Mechatronics, OÖ
 K2-Mobility – K2-Mobility SVT sustainable vehicle technologies, STMK
 MPPE – Integrated Research in Materials, Processing and Product Engineering, STMK
 ACIB – Austrian Center of Industrial Biotechnology, STMK
 XTribology Excellence Center of Tribology, NÖ

K1 Centers
K1 centers receive a funding for 7 years.

 Pro2Future - Products and Production Systems of the Future, NÖ + STMK
 Bioenergy 2020+, STMK
 RCPE – Research Center for Pharmaceutical Engineering, STMK
 CEST – Centre of Excellence in Electrochemical Surface Technology and Materials, NÖ
 CTR – Competence Centre for Advanced Sensor Technologies (CTR Carinthian Tech Research AG) K
 evolaris – evolaris next level, STMK
 FTW – Competence Center for Information and Communication Technologies, W
 K1-MET – Competence Center for excellent Technologies in Advanced Metallurgical and Environmental Process Development, OÖ
 KNOW – Know-Center Graz – Kompetenzzentrum für wissensbasierte Anwendungen und Systeme GmbH, STMK
 ONCOTYROL – Center for Personalized Cancer Medicine, T
 SCCH – Software Competence Center Hagenberg, OÖ
 Wood COMET – Kompetenzzentrum für Holzverbundwerkstoffe und Holzchemie, OÖ
 ACMIT - Austrian Center for Medical Innovation and Technology, NÖ
 PCCL-K1 - Polymer Competence Center Leoben, Stmk
 SBA 2 - Secure Business Austria 2, Wien
 VRVis - Visualization, Rendering and Visual Analysis Research Center, Wien
 alpS - Centre for Climate Change Adaptation Technologies, Tirol

K Projects
K projects are large scientific projects that help prepare for a more prominent cooperation of the contributors in the future. They receive a funding for 3 to 5 years.

References
 Otto Starzer: Tagung Kompetenz und Exzellenz, Präsentation: COMET - Am Weg zu österreichischer Exzellenz in kooperativer Forschung. 2010 (Otto Starzer: COMET – Am Weg zur österreichischer Exzellenz in kooperativer Forschung, ffg.at).
 F. Fahringer: Überblick und Vergleich der Forschungsförderung in Österreich. (= Berichte aus Energie- und Umweltforschung 10/2012), Bundesministerium für Verkehr, Innovation und Technologie, 2012, 3.2.2 Kompetenzzentren, S. 36 ff (Überblick und Vergleich der  Forschungsförderung in Österreich (PDF; 2,8 MB), nachhaltigwirtschaften.at).

Notes

Science and technology in Austria